Bugotak is a river in Toguchinsky District of Novosibirsk Oblast. The river flows into the Inya. Its length is 40 km (25 mi).

The tributaries of the river are the Kamenka (27 km), Karpysak (15 km), Kamenka (8 km).

Gallery

External links
 Государственный водный реестр: река Буготак. State Water Register: Bugotak River.

Rivers of Novosibirsk Oblast